Harshada Khanvilkar is an Indian television, film actress, producer and costume designer. She known for her role in Pudhcha Paaul as Akkasaheb and Rang Maza Vegla as Saundarya Inamdar.

Career 
Harshada completed her study IES George School and Kirti M. Doongursee College. She quit her law course to pursue acting. Harshada started her career with the Hindi serial Dard, which ran on Doordarshan in the 1990s. In 1999, she landed a role in Abhalmaya. She is also a costume designer she did many costumes designs for shows.

Thereafter, she acted in many serials such as Gurukul, Oon Paaus, Kalat Nakalat,  Astitva...Ek Prem Kahani,  Damini, Maziya Priyala Preet Kalena, etc. In 2011, she bagged a role in Pudhcha Paaul as Akkasaheb. She also appeared in Bigg Boss Marathi 1 as guest. In 2019, she played a Inspector role in Ghadge & Suun. Currently, she appears in Rang Maza Vegla as Saundarya Inamdar.

Filmography

Films

Television

Producer

References

External links 
 Harshada Khanvilkar on IMDb

Indian film actresses
Living people
Actresses in Marathi cinema
Actresses from Maharashtra
Indian stage actresses
20th-century Indian actresses
21st-century Indian actresses
Actresses in Marathi television
Actresses in Hindi television
Indian television actresses
1973 births